The Lorenz Corporation, previously known as Lorenz Publishing Company, is a music publisher located in Dayton, Ohio, United States. It is best known for its publication of church music for smaller congregations served by amateur musicians. It also publishes other varieties of music and general education materials.

History

The company was founded by E.S. Lorenz in 1890 and has been under the management of E.S. Lorenz and his descendants since that time.  The idea came in 1889 "when he had compiled a hymnal for the United Brethren Publishing House located in downtown Dayton." In the 1970s and 1980s, the company changed its name to Lorenz Industries, and then The Lorenz Corporation. Reiff Lorenz, a great great grandson of the founder, operates the company today.

The company filed for federal bankruptcy protection on August 19, 2020.

Current business
Some of its active imprints are dedicated to music publishing and others focus on general education.

Music publishing 
Copyrights/Imprints
 Heritage Music Press
 Lorenz
 The Roger Dean Company
 SoundForth
 Word Music & Church Resources

Subscriptions

The Lorenz Corporation has nine bi-monthly publications for musicians, including the following:
Keyboard
 The Organist
 The Organ Portfolio
 The Sacred Organ Journal
 The Church Pianist
 Keyboard Worship & Praise
Handbell
 Ring and Rejoice
Choral
 The SAB Choir
 The Volunteer Choir
Classroom
 Activate!

Educational publishing 
The Lorenz Corporation started publishing general education materials under Lorenz Educational Press in 2008.

Copyrights/Imprints
 LEP Interactive
 Lorenz Educational Press
 Milliken Publishing
 Teaching and Learning Company
 Show What You Know® Publishing

References

External links
 Company web site
 Company Listing, Music Publishers Association of the United States
 NAMM Oral History Interview with Geoffrey Lorenz, April 30, 2005
 NAMM Oral History Interview with Reiff Lorenz, April 29, 2016

American companies established in 1890
Publishing companies established in 1890
1890 establishments in Ohio
Music publishing companies of the United States
Companies based in Dayton, Ohio
Companies that filed for Chapter 11 bankruptcy in 2020